The National Rhythm & Blues Hall of Fame is an independent organization whose mission is to educate and to celebrate, preserve, promote, and present rhythm and blues music globally.

History 
The National Rhythm & Blues Hall of Fame was founded in 2010. Its name was originally the Official Rhythm & Blues Music Hall of Fame. It was founded and developed by the very successful American professional basketball player LaMont "ShowBoat" Robinson, who is also an R&B activist and an entrepreneur. Robinson is also the founder and owner/player of the comedy basketball team the Harlem Clowns. 

Robinson's love for R&B and soul music began at an early age. He would often attend music practice sessions with his musician uncle, a house band member at Leo's Casino, a night club in Cleveland, Ohio. It was one of the premier clubs in the Midwest during the 1960s for R&B, jazz, and African American comedians such as Redd Foxx, Flip Wilson, Richard Pryor and Moms Mabley. This love for R&B inspired Robinson to start collecting memorabilia and artifacts that reflect the history of the rhythm and blues era. Robinson collected many of these exclusive and rare items while traveling all over the world to play basketball with the Globetrotters and other teams.

Realizing that his collection had grown to a size worthy of a museum, Robinson wanted to share or donate some of his collection to an officially recognized location. However, he was unable to locate a place that exclusively displayed, celebrated, and collected information about the great accomplishments of R&B artists besides the Rock and Roll Hall of Fame in his hometown Cleveland. While donating some items to the Rock Hall, he realized that this would never give a lot of well-deserving R&B artists the type of recognition or honor that they deserve. He then decided to pursue creating such a place, acquiring the support of friends, some of which are Rhythm & Blues and Jazz musicians.

After many years of planning, a mobile museum debuted in February 2012. An annual Hall of Fame induction ceremony followed honoring artists, non-musical individuals, venues, events, and anything that has influenced the world of R&B music. A permanent physical museum was ultimately planned.

National Rhythm & Blues Hall of Fame weekend, induction ceremony 
The Inaugural Official Rhythm & Blues Music Hall of Fame Induction Ceremony was held on August 17, 2013 at the Waetjen Auditorium at Cleveland State University in Cleveland. The first class of inductees included recording acts The Supremes, The Temptations, The Marvelettes, The O'Jays, Martha & The Vandellas (Martha Reeves, Rosalind Holmes, and Annette Helton), The Dramatics, Ruby & The Romantics, and The Dazz Band Featuring Jerry Bell and Little Jimmy Scott; historic venue Leo's Casino; international journalist Larry Cotton; and radio hosts Tom Joyner and Tim Marshall. On December 20, 2017, 17 names were added to the list of inductees as 20th Century Early Music Influences such as Sammy Davis, Jr, Ruth Brown, Bill Haley, Louis Armstrong and others. On February 17, 2018, the Rhythm & Blues Hall of Fame founder Lamont "ShowBoat" Robinson lifelong Temptations fan and collector give a tribute concert for the late great Dennis Edwards, called The Dennis Edwards Tribute to honor him for all his musical work and for his family and fans in Detroit, MI at Bert's Entertainment Complex to a packed house. Edwards was inducted into the National Rhythm & Blues Hall of Fame in 2013 with the Temptations and in 2015 with his own group The Temptations Review feat Dennis Edwards. The National Rhythm & Blues Hall of Fame has announced it will forgo its live induction ceremony honoring its 2020 class due to the coronavirus pandemic. In a statement, released by the Founder/CEO LaMont Robinson he said, "Due to the ongoing COVID-19 pandemic, the National Rhythm & Blues Hall of Fame will replace the live annual induction ceremony with a special online salute honoring the class of 2020 Inductees on its official website @ www.rbhof.com The National Rhythm & Blues Hall of Fame induction committee group will combine the 2020 and the 2021 class together, and will have a special class of 16 inductees this year called the 2020 Posthumously Class of Pioneers. The National Rhythm & Blues Hall of Fame also added that the 2021 Music Hall of Fame Weekend will resume next August 2022. The 2021 10th annual induction ceremony was originally scheduled for this past August @ the Charles H. Wright Museum in Detroit, Michigan.
Over the years, the National Rhythm & Blues of Fame inductions have taken place at the following locations.

Hall of fame 
The main purpose of developing the National Rhythm & Blues Hall of Fame is to collect and preserve artifacts and to document accomplishments of individuals involved in R&B and Hip-Hop music.

The location for the Hall of Fame has not been decided even though many cities have expressed interest. Once built the museum will house a collection of historical artifacts and interactive presentations. It will also provide an educational wing that will contain a library and research department, a gift shop, and possibly a juke joint style soul food restaurant. A 1,500-seat theater will allow for small concerts, lectures and the showing of documentaries.  The Hall of Fame section of the facility will be a dynamic area that honors the legends and individuals that have been inducted. The Museum section will display historical and present-day artifacts that have been and are still being collected.

The museum will exhibit present-day music contributions and the history of Rhythm & Blues, Blues, Hip-Hop, Gospel, and Jazz music from the early days originating in the 1940s when "urban-based music with a heavy insistent beat" was becoming more popular. It will explore the Chitlin' Circuit where black-only clubs existed and supported black musicians. The museum plans to provide information about well known as well as unknown artists, and non-artist who have had a major influence on all black music. Plans "include an African-American Music Research Center, Gospel Music & Preachers Experience and the Hip Hop of America".

Mobile exhibit 
The National Rhythm & Blues Hall of Fame will be an innovative traveling exhibit housing memorabilia spanning the era of R&B/Hip-Hop and other music Jazz and the Blues is designed to travel throughout the country setting up at various locations such as libraries, schools, churches, community centers and special events. The mobile museum is an educational approach to present historical artifacts to areas of the country that would not have heard about the museum and would pique the interest of potential tourist that may visit the actual museum. The museum has collected and is still in the process of collecting thousands of rare treasures. Among its present collection are rare photos, original documents, and many items from artists whose contributions helped shape an important era of the music industry. The collection will be an unparalleled representation of any music memorabilia collection. These original items which mostly have been donated by the artist and non-artist or their estates, cover the beginnings of R&B and Black Music from its early days in the 1930s to the present day.

Members 

* 2015 Induction ceremony in Clarksdale MI
** 2015 Induction ceremony in Detroit
*** Inducted as a 20th Century Early Music Influence

Special awards and honors 

* 2015 Induction ceremony in Clarksdale, MS
** 2015 Induction ceremony in Detroit

References 

2010 establishments in Michigan
American music awards
Awards established in 2010
Awards honoring African Americans
Halls of fame in Michigan
Music R
Lifetime achievement awards
Music hall of fame inductees
Music halls of fame
Music organizations based in the United States
Rhythm and blues